USM Blida is a football club based in Blida. The club was formed in 1932 by some of Algerian nationalists which decided to create a Muslim club to compete with the European clubs of the moments when Algeria was a French district (French Algeria).

This page is a season-by-season record of club's league and cup performance in national and international competitions.

Before independence
Below, the USM Blida season-by-season record before independence in the French Algeria period :

After independence
Below, the USM Blida season-by-season record after independence of Algeria :

Notes and references

Notes

References

External links 
footballdatabase.eu

Seasons
Blida